Angle is an album by English jazz pianist Howard Riley, which was released on CBS in 1969 as part of their Realm Jazz Series, and reissued on CD by Columbia in 1999. It features his working trio of that period, with bassist Barry Guy and drummer Alan Jackson. The fully notated "Three Fragments" is a flute-piano duet with Barbara Thompson.

Reception

The Penguin Guide to Jazz notes that "Riley is the only credited composer on the album, which perhaps accounts for its thoughtful and rather reserved character."

In a review for Record Collector, Ian McCann stated that the "rhythm section, Barry Guy and Alan Jackson, are deeply in sync... Angle'''s lengthy title track fits its name, all pointed turns; 'Gormenghast'... is agreeably dense; 'Gill' lets gospel back into the music, then leads it astray; 'Fragment' is beautifully tender and complex; the twisted 'Three Fragments' adds Barbara Thompson's eerie flute."

Track listingAll compositions by Howard Riley''
 "Exit" – 5:00
 "Gormenghast" – 7:02
 "S&S" – 2:15
 "Fragment" – 7:40
 "Angle" – 7:10
 "Aftermath" – 2:30
 "Three Fragments" – 2:51
 "Gill" – 5:42

Personnel
Howard Riley – piano
Barry Guy – bass 
Alan Jackson – drums 
Barbara Thompson – flute on 7

References

1969 albums
Howard Riley (musician) albums
CBS Records albums